The Siemens S70, its successor the S700 and European variant, the Avanto, are a series of low-floor light-rail vehicles (LRV) and streetcars manufactured by Siemens Mobility, a division of German conglomerate Siemens AG. 

The S70 and S700 are built for the United States market where the vehicles are in use on several light rail and streetcar systems. The S70 was manufactured from 2002 to 2017 and the S700 from 2014 to present, but the model designation S700 was only introduced in 2019 and then retroactively applied to certain versions of the S70 built in earlier years. In this field, it competes mainly with Bombardier and Kinki Sharyo low-floor LRVs and modern streetcars manufactured by Inekon and Brookville Equipment Corporation.

The Avanto was built for the European market starting in 2006 and was principally sold to tram-train systems which, in whole or part, share their tracks with heavy rail trains. In Europe, the Siemens Combino and Avenio models are the preferred offerings for purely light rail or tramway systems. In the tram-train market, its principal competitors are Bombardier's Flexity Link and Alstom's Citadis. To date, the Avanto has been sold to two tram-train operations in France.

History 

The first order for S70 vehicles in the U.S. – where the three-section model was originally known as S70 Avanto but soon became known only as the S70 – was placed in 2001 for the MetroRail system in Houston, Texas, and the first car was received by Houston in April 2003. This first series of S70 cars entered service on January 1, 2004, the opening day of Houston's light rail system.

The first purchase of the European version, a five-section tram-train design sold under the Avanto brand name, was a 15-car order placed in July 2002 by SNCF, for its line between Aulnay-sous-Bois and Bondy, which is now known as Île-de-France tramway Line 4.

Redesign and model number change 
At Siemens's U.S. manufacturing facilities (in Sacramento, California), only model S700 remains in production, the last S70s having been built in 2017, for Minneapolis–Saint Paul's Metro Transit light rail system. The model number S700 was adopted by Siemens Mobility in 2019 as a rebranding of a version of the S70 that had been in production since 2014. That newer version resulted from a redesign in which Siemens adapted the center-section truck that it had previously used in its SD660 model (built 1996–2005) to the S70, for the purpose of allowing longitudinal (sideways-facing) seating to be used there, in place of transverse seating, for better passenger comfort and movement. The first LRVs built to the newer design were the "Type 5" cars of Portland, Oregon's MAX Light Rail system, in 2014, but initially Siemens continued to sell LRVs with either center-section configuration and used the designation S70 for both. In 2019, the company began using the designation S700 for new orders, and in 2020 it retroactively applied the S700 designation to all LRVs and streetcars that had been built to the newer design since its creation in 2013 or 2014.

Size and configuration 
The S70, S700, and Avanto have a modular design and can be built in a number of different sizes and configurations, including both light-rail vehicle (LRV) and streetcar versions.

The San Diego Trolley and the Salt Lake City TRAX systems have purchased the US variants.

The major change between the S70 and the S700 is the seating in the center section of the vehicle. The S700 has longitudinal seating in this section with passengers facing the aisle, while the S70 had more traditional seating with passengers sitting four-across, facing forward or back, with an aisle in between. This 2013 change, which was made to eliminate a seating layout that had been criticized as cramped and ease the movement of passengers within that section, was the primary design change that led Siemens eventually to adopt (in 2019) the new model number for the modified S70 design. The S700 also has some technology upgrades.

Most vehicles are double-ended, with operating controls at both ends and doors on both sides. An exception are 40 cars in service on TriMet's MAX system, which are single-ended and have cabs at only one end of each car. However, in service they always operate in pairs, coupled back-to-back, so that each consist has operating cabs at both ends. TriMet reverted to a double-ended design for its latest order of S700s (placed in 2019).

The S70, S700 and Avanto can be configured to operate on various overhead power supply systems. For example, the Avantos ordered for France are dual voltage, capable of operating on 750 V DC when running on tram or light rail tracks and on  when running on main line tracks.

The S70 and S700 can also be equipped to interface with older Siemens light rail vehicles. The San Diego Trolley's S70 and S700 vehicles frequently operate with high-floor SD-100 vehicles.

Usage and current orders

United States 

 Atlanta, Georgia (Atlanta Streetcar): 4 S70 Streetcar units, ordered in 2011. In May 2011, Siemens announced that it had won the $17.2 million contract to build the four streetcars that run on the Atlanta Streetcar. The vehicles were built at Siemens' plant in Florin, California, but with major components, including the propulsion system, assembled at Siemens' plant in Alpharetta, Georgia. The first of the streetcars was delivered on February 17, 2014, and began passenger service on December 30, 2014.
 Charlotte, North Carolina
 Lynx Blue Line: 42 S70 units purchased and now operating. First 16 cars, purchased for $50 million, have been in service since the opening of the Charlotte light rail system in November 2007. Four additional units purchased in 2008 to keep up with higher-than-expected ridership were received in early 2010. In 2012, after 4 years of operation, the original 16 cars had to be repaired at the Siemens facility in California for an estimated cost of $400,000 each. A third order, for 22 LRVs, was delivered in stages between fall 2014 and spring 2017, and CATS now operates 42 S70 vehicles.
 CityLynx Gold Line: Six S700 streetcar units were ordered in 2016, and were delivered in 2019–2020. These six cars were specified to have internal batteries to allow off-wire operations in some areas. The S700 streetcars are a compact version of the S70 light rail vehicles that currently operate on the LYNX Blue Line. The cost to purchase these six vehicles and spare parts is $40.4 million.
 Houston, Texas (METRORail): 18 S70 units purchased, the first of which was delivered in April 2003; delivery was completed in late 2004. Nineteen additional units were purchased later, procured using Utah Transit Authority (Salt Lake City) options, delivered starting in late 2012. The original cars are the long variant; the 2012–13 cars are the US ("Ultra Short") variant. 14 more S700 units were ordered in early 2019.

 Minneapolis–Saint Paul, Minnesota (Metro): 64 S70 units purchased. Delivery of initial order of 59 began in 2012, with the first unit entering service in February 2013.  In October 2015, an option was exercised for five additional vehicles at a cost of $20 million, and these were received in fall 2017. In October 2016, an order was placed for 27 more S70s, to a modified design that has since been rebranded S700 by Siemens.  Delivery began in May 2020.
 Norfolk, Virginia (Tide Light Rail): 9 S70 cars, ordered in 2007. First cars delivered October 2009.  Entered service with the opening of the Norfolk system, in 2011.
 Phoenix, Arizona (Valley Metro Rail): 11 S700 vehicles ordered, in June 2017, with options for up to 67 more. Fourteen options exercised in October 2020. Began to enter service January 2022.
 Portland, Oregon (MAX Light Rail): 22 S70 and 18 S700 units purchased and now in operation.  Order for initial 21 S70 cars announced on May 11, 2006; later expanded by one car. Entered service starting in August 2009. Order placed 2012 for another 18 cars; delivered in 2014–2015 and subsequently rebranded as S700 by Siemens. An order for 26 S700 units was placed in July 2019, with delivery scheduled to run from mid-2021 to fall 2022. Unlike Portland's previous S70 and S700 LRVs, these will be double-ended.
 Sacramento, California (Sacramento RT Light Rail): 20 S700 units ordered in 2020 for the Sacramento RT Light Rail system, with options for a total of 76 cars. Shortly after the initial 20-unit order, Sacramento was awarded by the California State Transportation Agency another $23.6 million dollars to purchase an additional 8 units, thus bringing the total number of S700 units on order for delivery beginning in 2022 to 28.
 Salt Lake City, Utah
 TRAX: 77 S70 US ("Ultra Short") units ordered; in service since August 7, 2011.
 S Line: S70 US units
 San Diego, California (San Diego Trolley): 11 S70 units purchased in first order in October 2004, with delivery complete in July 2005. A second order, for 57 S70 US ("Ultra Short" ) cars, was placed in October 2009; the order was later increased to a total of 65 S70 US units in 2012.  45 additional cars, now of the rebranded model S700 US, entered service in April 2019 and the last cars in the order were received in October 2020. Meanwhile, an additional 25 S700s were ordered in mid-2019.
 Santa Ana, California (OC Streetcar): 8 S700 streetcar units ordered in March 2018 for the under construction OC Streetcar light rail line.
 Seattle, Washington (Link light rail): 152 S700 units on order.  Of these, an order for 122 was placed in September 2016 and delivery began in 2019. This $554 million contract was the largest contract in Sound Transit's history. The order was expanded by 30 cars in spring 2017. The LRVs will be used for expansion of the Central Link system. Entered service in May of 2021.

France 

The S70 model used in France is known as the Avanto and locally designated as the U 25500. Unlike the S70 models in the USA, the Avanto has 5 sections instead of 3.

 Paris (Île-de-France tramway Line 4): 15 tram-train units purchased. Entered service starting on November 18, 2006.
 Mulhouse (Mulhouse tramway): 12 tram-train units delivered, for use on an SNCF line from Mulhouse to Thann, Haut-Rhin. First unit delivered on November 6, 2009.

Cancelled orders 
 An order for 22 S70 cars, placed in 2006 by Ottawa, Ontario for a planned expansion of its O-Train system, was later cancelled. Political problems had resulted in cancellation of the entire expansion project, which in turn led to lawsuits by Siemens and other contractors against the City of Ottawa.

See also 
 Light rail in North America
 Streetcars in North America
 Siemens–Duewag U2
 Siemens SD-100 and SD-160
 Siemens SD-400 and SD-460
 Siemens S200

Notes

References

External links 

 Siemens USA Light rail vehicles and streetcars (official webpage)

Tram vehicles of France
Electric multiple units of the United States
Streetcars of the United States
Light rail vehicles
Siemens tram vehicles
Articulated passenger trains
600 V DC multiple units
750 V DC multiple units
1500 V DC multiple units
25 kV AC multiple units
Siemens multiple units